Oun Kham (June 5, 1811 – December 15, 1895) was King of Luang Prabang during 1868-1887 and a second time between 1889 and 1895.  The last two years of his reign ended with the establishment of a French protectorate over Laos. When unable to hold off outlaw Chinese Black Flag Army forces, he sought assistance from Rattanakosin for help. When the Siamese army left in 1887, the band of the White Tai pirate Deo Van Tri had overwhelmed Luang Prabang, which made Oun Kham seek refuge at Pak Lay. On 7 June 1887 the Lao royal capital was seized and sacked; the elderly ruler barely escaped with his life. Between his two ruling periods he was exiled in Bangkok where he gave assistance to Auguste Pavie.

References

|-

1895 deaths
1811 births
19th-century Laotian people